A bed frame or bedstead is the part of a bed used to position the bed base, the flat part which in turn directly supports the mattress(es). The frame may also stop the matresses from sliding sideways, and it may include means of supporting a canopy above. Bed frames are typically made of wood or metal. A bed frame includes head, foot, and side rails. Most double (full) sized beds, along with all queen and king size beds, require some type of center support rail, typically also with extra feet extending down to the floor. The term "bed frame" was first used in 1805-1815. Not all beds include frames; see bed base.

Brass beds
Brass beds are beds in which the headboard and footboard are made of brass; the frame rails are usually made of steel. Brass beds can be made of 100 per cent brass or of metals that have been brass-plated. The brass used in making brass beds is usually 70 per cent copper and 30 per cent zinc. The ratio of metals may vary between manufacturers. 

Brass beds were originally simple and plain. Throughout the centuries, designs have become increasingly elaborate and can contain extensive ornamentation such as porcelain finials. Some brass bed styles include traditional, Art Deco, Victorian, transitional, Edwardian and contemporary.

Iron beds
Iron beds are beds in which the headboard and footboard are made of iron; the frame rails are usually made of steel.  Iron beds were developed in 17th century Italy to address concerns about infestation by bed bugs and moths. An iron cradle (with dangerously pointed corner posts) has been dated to 1620-1640. From the start of their production in the 1850s until World War I, iron beds were handmade. The manufacturing process included hand pouring and polishing intricately detailed casting and hand applying finishes. In the many small foundries of the time that employed only a handful of employees, it could take days to produce a single bed.

After the end of World War I, the mass-production methods used for wartime affected the iron industry as well. The handmade quality gave way to cost-effective mass production. 

Today’s iron beds are constructed of cold roll, heavy-gauge steel tubing and solid bar stock.

Almost all iron beds now have a beech wood sprung slatted base in a steel framework which gives support to all types of mattresses.

Wooden drawer beds
Some wooden-based beds have drawers. The bed frame is a wooden box with a hole cut out for the mattress, with drawers underneath.

See also 
 Storage bed, a bed with built in storage, usually as part of the bed frame

References 

Beds